Palast means palace in German and may refer to
Palast (surname)
Palast Orchester, a German orchestra based in Berlin
König Palast (Kings Palace), an arena in Krefeld, Germany
Friedrichstadt-Palast, a revue in the Berlin district, Germany
Ufa-Palast am Zoo,  a former major cinema in Berlin